Jang In-gwon (born 17 November 1945) is a South Korean judoka. He competed in the men's half-middleweight event at the 1972 Summer Olympics.

References

1945 births
Living people
South Korean male judoka
Olympic judoka of South Korea
Judoka at the 1972 Summer Olympics
Place of birth missing (living people)